Kampong Rataie is a village in Temburong District, Brunei. The population was 2,182 in 2016. It is one of the villages within Mukim Bokok. The village encompasses the public housing estates STKRJ Kampong Rataie and RPN Kampong Rataie. The postcode is PE2751.

Facilities 
Rataie Primary School is the village's government primary school.

The village mosque is RPN Kampong Rataie Mosque.

References 

Rataie